Close to the Sun may refer to:
 Close to the Sun (album), a 2017 album by Place Vendome
 Close to the Sun (video game), a 2019 video game
 "Close to the Sun", a mashup song by Neil Cicierega from his 2014 album Mouth Silence
 "Close to the Sun", a song by German DJ TheFatRat

See also
 Too Close to the Sun, a musical
 Closer to the Sun (disambiguation)
 Corona, the outer atmosphere of a star
 Perihelion, the closest point of an orbit to the sun